YUR may refer to:

 Genetic code for leucine
 Yurok language, ISO 639-3
 ISO 4217 for Yugoslav Reformed dinar,